"Binetsu" is Aya Ueto's sixth single. It was released on November 27, 2003. The first pressing came with an 18-page photo booklet. This single marked a turning point in Ueto's career as a singer where she took control over her appearance and sound.

Track list

Live performances
 November 28, 2003 — Music Station
 December 4, 2003 — Utaban
 December 13, 2003 — Pop Jam
 December 26, 2003 — Music Station Super Live 2003

Charts

Oricon Sales Chart

2003 singles